Chandragiri Fort is an historical fort, built in the 11th century located at Chandragiri suburb in Tirupati. It is situated in Tirupati district of Andhra Pradesh, India. Although mostly associated with the Vijayanagara Emperors, it was built much earlier in 11th century by the Yadava rulers. In 1460 A.D. Odra Gajapati Kapilendra Dev captured the Chandragiri Fort.

History
Chandragiri was under the rule Vijayanagara empire for about three centuries and came under the control of the Vijayanagarayadava rulers in 1367. It came into prominence during 1560s during the reign of Saluva Narasimha Deva Raya. Later, the most famous Vijayanagara emperor Srikrishna Devaraya, was kept in this fort as a prince, till his coronation at Penukonda. It is also said that he met his future queen Chinna Devi at this fort. Chandragiri was the 4th capital of Vijayanagara Empire, Rayas shifted their capital to here when the Golconda sultans attacked Penukonda. In 1646 the fort was annexed to the Golkonda territory and subsequently came under Kingdom of Mysore rule. It went into oblivion from 1792 onward. The Raja Mahal Palace is now an archaeological museum. The palace is an example of Indo-Sarcen architecture of Vijayanagara period.  The crowning towers represents the Hindu architectural elements. The palace was constructed using stone, brick, lime mortar and devoid of timber.
Some of important kavyas or epic poems are written in this fort under the patronage of Vijayanagara kings. Inside the fort are eight temples, Raja Mahal, Rani Mahal and other ruined structures.
Inside the fort are Raja Mahal and Rani Mahal which are quite well maintained for more than 300 years and Raja Mahal is converted as Archeological Museum by Arechological Survey of India. The museum holds models of fort, main temple and other structures of surrounding area. Both of these building were constructed without using wood and only lime, brick and morter was used. Rani Mahal has flat roof and at base level it has stable and epigraphical evidence says that this building was also used as commanders quarters.

The fort is the place where the pact of granting lands for Fort St. George to the British was signed by Vijayanagara King Sri Rangaraya during August 1639.

Vyasathirtha
Sage Vyasatirtha used to reside here and was a spiritual advisor to King  Saluva Narasimha Deva Raya and he was entrusted with worship at Tirumala temple. Vyasathirtha remained in Chandragiri in the court of Narasimha Raya II. The fort is at a distance of 11 km from the famous Tirupati Temple and there is a foot path to temple from this fort, which is the reason the sage resided here.

Srivari Mettu
The famous Srivari Mettu, one of the well known walking pathis to Tirumala Venkateshwara Temple starts from this fort and it was originally used by Royal family of Vijayanagara Kingdom, which over the years is allowed to be used to public.

References

Tirupati
Tirupati district
Forts in Andhra Pradesh
Buildings and structures in Tirupati
Vijayanagara Empire
Archaeological sites in Andhra Pradesh
11th-century establishments in India
Buildings and structures completed in the 11th century
Monuments of National Importance in Andhra Pradesh
Palaces in Andhra Pradesh